Senator Armbruster may refer to:

Christian H. Armbruster (1921–1986), New York State Senate
Jeff Armbruster (fl. 1990s–2000s), Ohio State Senate

See also
Ken Armbrister (born 1946), Texas State Senate